Elizabeth "Liz"  Donnelly is a fictional character from the NBC crime drama Law & Order: Special Victims Unit, portrayed by Judith Light. She made her first screen appearance during the third season episode "Guilt", which was broadcast on March 29, 2002.

Development

Creation and casting
Elizabeth Donnelly was conceived by producer Ted Kotcheff. He wanted Judith Light to make a guest appearance on the show, after he saw her in a production of Wit. However, Light had to tour with the play and was unable to take up Kotcheff's offer. When Light returned to New York, Kotcheff remembered her and offered her the role of Donnelly. Light commented, "perhaps they were looking to create another strong female on the show, but that's how it came about." Gail Shister from The Philadelphia Inquirer reported Light's casting on February 19, 2002, saying she had been cast in a recurring role as the "tough new bureau chief". Light made her first appearance on March 29, 2002.

Characterization
In their book The Law and Order: Special Victims Unit Unofficial Companion, Susan Green and Randee Dawn described Donnelly as having "a steely presence with a sure moral compass". They also noted that other than her career path, little was known about Donnelly's life. Light said her character was "in love with the law" and not open to corruption, as she always wanted to do the right thing. Light called Donnelly "powerful" and added that she often helped people who had potential. After serving as Bureau Chief ADA, Donnelly became a judge in the seventh season.

Character biography
Although originally appearing as a Bureau Chief ADA, Donnelly is elevated to judgeship.  While working for the Manhattan District Attorney's Office, however, she serves as the supervisor of Alexandra Cabot (Stephanie March) and her successor, Casey Novak (Diane Neal); Donnelly has presided over numerous cases prosecuted by Casey Novak, as well as a case prosecuted by Novak's successor, Kim Greylek (Michaela McManus), in the episode "Persona".

Although a judge, Donnelly represents both Novak and Det. Elliot Stabler (Christopher Meloni) in the season 8 episode "Haystack", when a man suing for custody of his child sues them for alleged conspiracy and assault. The suits are dropped, however, following the man's arrest on kidnapping charges.

In the season 7 episode "Gone", Donnelly's office is bugged, resulting in a witness being abducted and murdered.  When Novak and SVU detectives are unable to link the homicide to the bugging, Donnelly is reluctantly forced to dismiss the case, due to lack of witness testimony, though it is later discovered that the defendants indeed bribed a court officer to bug her office. Donnelly helps to catch the officer responsible and interrogate her.

In the season 9 episode "Cold", Donnelly calls Novak to her office and informs her that she will be censured and suspended for possibly a year or more for violating Brady rules. Novak asks her what she should do, and Donnelly replies, "Something else."

In the season 10 episode "Persona", Donnelly takes a leave of absence from her role as a judge to act as prosecutor on a cold case she was involved with in the 1970s, when a battered woman (Brenda Blethyn) murdered her husband. She admits to Det. Olivia Benson (Mariska Hargitay) that she was responsible for the woman escaping from custody and therefore took on the case due to "unfinished business". Her role in the escape leads to mishaps in the justice system being termed "doing a Donnelly" for many years to come. This episode calls attention to the difficulty Donnelly experiences as a woman working in the justice system. The woman claims to have been raped, but Donnelly believes she is just manipulative and was using it as an excuse to get away with murder since she had fled Donnelly when she had asked for a meeting to discuss a plea deal. When the woman gets on the stand and tells her story, Donnelly confronts her with her escape and she reveals why she ran: she was pregnant from her rape and wanted an abortion, but couldn't get it in prison. She had approached Donnelly with the intention of agreeing to plead guilty in exchange for being allowed to get the abortion, but lost her nerve when she saw how strong of a woman Donnelly was and believed she was weak. This revelation stuns Donnelly and clearly deeply affects her. The woman is found not guilty of the murder but guilty of the escape, and Donnelly decides to ask for probation at sentencing.

In the season 10 finale episode "Zebras", Donnelly is poisoned by a syringe (containing potassium chloride, the chemical used for lethal injections) that CSU Tech Intern Dale Stuckey (Noel Fisher) had placed on a chair in her home, resulting in her hospitalization. He did this to get revenge against her for berating him after he made a mistake that cost the prosecution a case. She survives, and is seen trying cases in later episodes.

Credits
Light appeared in a total of 25 episodes of SVU; 12 episodes as Bureau Chief ADA (more than any other character in the Bureau Chief capacity), and 13 episodes as Judge Donnelly.

Reception
Green and Dawn praised Donnelly's introduction, saying she was "the ballsiest character the franchise has ever invented – male or female." They also wrote that Donnelly helped to add depth to the DA's office. Clarissa from TVOvermind enjoyed Donnelly's reappearance in the season twelve episode "Behave".

References

Fictional judges
Fictional lawyers
Law & Order: Special Victims Unit characters
Television characters introduced in 2002
American female characters in television